The 10th Legislative Assembly of British Columbia sat from 1903 to 1906. The members were elected in the British Columbia general election held in October 1903.
This election was the first in British Columbia to be contested by competing political parties. The British Columbia Conservative Party led by Richard McBride, having won the majority of seats, formed the government.

Charles Edward Pooley served as speaker.

Members of the 10th General Assembly 
The following members were elected to the assembly in 1903.:

Notes:

Party standings

By-elections 
By-elections were held for the following members appointed to the provincial cabinet, as was required at the time:
 Charles Wilson, Attorney General, elected November 21, 1903
 Frederick John Fulton, President of Executive Council, acclaimed June 1, 1904

By-elections were held to replace members for various other reasons:

Notes:

References 

Political history of British Columbia
Terms of British Columbia Parliaments
1903 establishments in British Columbia
1906 disestablishments in British Columbia
20th century in British Columbia